Charles Kelsey may refer to:

 Charles S. Kelsey (1822–1901), Wisconsin politician
 Charles William Kelsey (1877–1975), Canadian stained glass artist